The United States Naval Aviation Hall of Honor, located at the National Naval Aviation Museum in Pensacola, Florida, recognizes individuals "who by their actions or achievements made outstanding contributions to Naval Aviation." Since its inception in 1979, the Hall of Honor has enshrined 80 people representing every element of the naval aviation family: U.S. Navy, U.S. Marine Corps, U.S. Coast Guard, Civilian and every naval aviation warfare community. Selectees are chosen by a board appointed by the Director, Air Warfare Division, Office of the Chief of Naval Operations, sponsor of the Hall of Honor, and approved by the Chief of Naval Operations.

See also

 North American aviation halls of fame
 Flying Leatherneck Aviation Museum
 United States Marine Corps Aviation

References

External links
Naval Aviation Hall of Honor official webpage

United States naval aviation
United States Marine Corps aviation
United States Coast Guard Aviation
Aviation halls of fame
Halls of fame in Florida
Pensacola, Florida
1979 establishments in Florida
Awards established in 1981